The UAE 1000 Guineas is a flat horse race in the United Arab Emirates for three-year-old thoroughbred fillies run at Meydan Racecourse in Dubai in February.

Records
Record time:
 1:35.84 – Folk (2007)

Leading jockey (4 wins):
 Frankie Dettori – Catstar (2004), Satin Kiss (2005), Gamilati (2012), Soft Whisper (2021)

Leading trainer (12 wins):
 Saeed bin Suroor – Muwakleh (2001), Infinite Spirit (2002), Mezzo Soprano (2003), Catstar (2004), Satin Kiss (2005), Cocoa Beach (2008), Siyaadah (2010), Ihtimal (2014), Local Time (2015), Winter Lightning (2018), Dubai Love (2020), Soft Whisper (2021)

Leading owner (12 wins):
 Godolphin – Infinite Spirit (2002), Mezzo Soprano (2003), Catstar (2004), Satin Kiss (2005), Siyaadah (2010), Gamilati (2012), Lovely Pass (2013), Ihtimal (2014), Local Time (2015), Winter Lightning (2018), Dubai Love (2020), Soft Whisper (2021)

Winners

See also
Road to the Kentucky Oaks
 List of United Arab Emirates horse races

References

Racing Post:

Flat horse races for three-year-olds
Triple Crown Prep Races
Horse races in the United Arab Emirates
Nad Al Sheba Racecourse

fr:United Arab Emirates Derby
ja:UAEダービー